The 1900–01 season was the sixth competitive season in Belgian football.

Overview
Only one official league existed at the time.  It was called Coupe de Championnat (Championship Cup) and was disputed between 9 teams.

No team was relegated this season since the FA decided to split the division into two leagues again.  Two new teams were admitted at the end of the season:  Antwerp F.C. and Union Saint-Gilloise.

Honour

Final table

External links
RSSSF archive - Final tables 1895-2002
Belgian clubs history